Firstpost is an Indian news website owned by Reliance Industries, which also runs CNN-News18 and CNBC-TV18.

The Network 18 group was originally owned by Raghav Bahl. In January 2012, the group received an investment from Mukesh Ambani's Reliance Industries through a rights issue of up to  crore.

History 
In May 2013, the news group was merged with the Indian edition of Forbes India whose four top editorial heads, including editor in chief Indrajit Gupta, were dismissed. The event led to a media furor. Thereafter on 31 May 2013, Firstpost took over a satirical website Fakingnews.com for an undisclosed amount.

As of April 2020, Jaideep Giridhar is the executive editor of Firstpost in Mumbai, while Sanjay Singh is the deputy executive editor.

On 26 January 2023, the prime-time show Vantage was launched, hosted by managing editor Palki Sharma, formerly of WION.

References

External links
 

Asian news websites
Indian news websites
Internet properties established in 2011
Mass media companies of India
Mass media in Mumbai
Network18 Group
New media